The 1980 Avon Championships World Championship Series was the 10th season since the foundation of the Women's Tennis Association. It commenced on January 7, 1980, and concluded on December 24, 1980, after 36 events. The Avon Championships World Championship Series was the elite tour for professional women's tennis organised by the Women's Tennis Association (WTA). The year is divided into two sponsored tours, with the first three months sponsored by Avon Series and the latter part by Colgate Series. It included the four Grand Slam tournaments and a series of other events. ITF tournaments were not part of the tour, although they awarded points for the WTA World Ranking.

Schedule 
The table below shows the 1980 Avon Championships World Championship Series schedule.

Key

January

February

March

April

May

June

July

August

September

October

November

December

Rankings 
Below are the 1980 WTA year-end rankings (December 31, 1980) in singles competition:

See also 
 1980 Men's Grand Prix circuit
 Women's Tennis Association
 International Tennis Federation

References

External links 
 Official WTA Tour website

 
WTA Tour
1980 WTA Tour